Ross Owen Davies (born 4 February 1955) is an Australian former Anglican bishop. He was the bishop of the Diocese of The Murray in the Anglican Church of Australia from 2002 to 2010.

Davies was educated at the University of Melbourne (BA 1977, LLB 1979) and St Barnabas College, Adelaide (Australian College of Theology, ThL 1981). He served in parishes in Australia until 1991, the last of which was as rector of St Paul's, Camperdown. He was then priest-in-charge of Mundford, Ickburgh and Cranwich (1991–94) and then curate of Somerton with Compton Dundon (1994–97). He then returned to Australia, where he was rector of Hindmarsh, South Australia (1997-2000), before becoming Archdeacon of The Murray (2000–02).

In 2002 he was appointed the bishop of the Diocese of The Murray in the Anglican Church of Australia. In September 2010, he resigned and was found guilty by a church tribunal of "disgraceful conduct and wilful violation of church ordinances". He was subsequently removed from holy orders on 13 December 2010, only the second bishop to do so.

Davies had belonged to the traditionalist Anglo-Catholic wing of Anglicanism. On 27 September 2010, three days after resigning as the Bishop of The Murray, he was received into the Roman Catholic Church as a layman by Philip Wilson, the Roman Catholic Archbishop of Adelaide.

References

External links
 Findings of the Special Tribunal

1955 births
21st-century Anglican bishops in Australia
Living people
Australian Anglo-Catholics
Australian Roman Catholics
Anglican bishop converts to Roman Catholicism
Anglican bishops of The Murray
Clergy removed from office